Statistics of Latvian Higher League in the 1964 season.

Overview 
It was contested by 14 teams, and ASK won the championship.

League standings

References 
 RSSSF

Latvian SSR Higher League
Football 
Latvia